Elizabeth Eaton Converse (born August 3, 1924, disappeared August 1974), known professionally as Connie Converse, was an American singer-songwriter and musician, active in New York City in the 1950s. Her work is among the earliest known recordings in the singer-songwriter genre of music.

Converse left her family home in 1974 in search of a new life and was not heard from again. Her music was largely unknown until it was featured on a 2004 radio show. In March 2009, a compilation album of her work, How Sad, How Lovely, was released.

Biography

Early life

Converse was born in Laconia, New Hampshire on August 3, 1924. She was raised in Concord, New Hampshire as the middle child in a strict Baptist family; her father was a minister and her mother was "musical", according to music historian David Garland. Her elder brother by three years was Paul Converse and her younger brother by five years, Philip Converse, became a prominent political scientist.

Converse attended Concord High School, where she was valedictorian and won eight academic awards, including an academic scholarship to Mount Holyoke College in Massachusetts. After two years' study, she left Mount Holyoke and moved to New York City.

Career

During the 1950s, Converse worked for the Academy Photo Offset printing house in New York's Flatiron District. She first lived in Greenwich Village, then in the Hell's Kitchen and Harlem areas. She started calling herself Connie, a nickname she had acquired in New York. She began writing songs and performing them for friends, accompanying herself on guitar. She began smoking during this time and started drinking; traits strongly contrary to her religious upbringing. Possibly as a result, her parents rejected her music career, and her father never heard her sing before his death.

Converse's only known public performance was a brief television appearance in 1954 on The Morning Show on CBS with Walter Cronkite, which graphic artist Gene Deitch had helped to arrange. In 1956, she recorded an album for her brother, Phil, titled Musicks (Volumes I and II). By 1961 (the same year that Bob Dylan moved to Greenwich Village and quickly met mainstream success), Converse had grown frustrated trying to sell her music in New York. That year, she moved to Ann Arbor, Michigan, where her brother Philip was a professor of political science at the University of Michigan. Converse worked in a secretarial job, and then as a writer for and Managing Editor of the Journal of Conflict Resolution in 1963. Following her move to Michigan, she mostly ceased writing new songs.

Personal life

Converse was very private about her personal life. According to Deitch, she would respond to questions about her personal life with curt "yes" or "no" answers. Both Deitch and Connie's brother Philip have said it is possible she might have been a lesbian, although she never confirmed or denied this notion. Her nephew, Tim Converse, has said there is no evidence that she was ever involved in a romantic relationship. Her family noted that Connie relied more heavily on smoking and drinking towards the end of her time living in Michigan.

Disappearance

By 1973, Converse was burnt out and depressed. The offices of The Journal of Conflict Resolution, which meant so much to her, left Michigan for Yale at the end of 1972, after being "auctioned off" without her knowledge. Converse's colleagues and friends pooled their money to give her a six-month trip to England in hopes of improving her mood, to no avail. Her mother requested that she join her on a trip to Alaska, and Converse begrudgingly agreed. Her displeasure with the trip appeared to have contributed to her decision to disappear. Around that time, Converse was told by doctors that she needed a hysterectomy, and the information appeared to have devastated her.

In August 1974, days after her 50th birthday, Converse wrote a series of letters to her family and friends, discussing her intention to make a new life somewhere else. She wrote, "Let me go. Let me be if I can. Let me not be if I can't. [...] Human society fascinates me & awes me & fills me with grief & joy; I just can't find my place to plug into it." With her letter to Philip, Converse included a check and a request that he make sure that her health insurance was paid for and in good standing for a certain amount of time following her departure, but for him to cease paying the policy on a certain date.

Converse was expected to go on an annual family trip to a lake, but by the time the letters were delivered, she had packed her belongings in her Volkswagen Beetle and driven away, never to be heard from again. The events of her life following her disappearance remain unknown. Several years after she left, someone told her brother Philip that they had seen a phone book listing for "Elizabeth Converse" in either Kansas or Oklahoma, but he never pursued the lead. About ten years after she disappeared, the family hired a private investigator in hopes of finding her. The investigator told the family, however, that even if he did find her, it was her right to disappear, and he could not simply bring her back. After that, her family respected her decision to leave, and ceased looking for her. Philip suspects she may have taken her own life—he specifically thinks she may have driven her car into a body of water—but her actual fate remains unknown.

Legacy

In January 2004, Deitch—by then 80 years old and having lived in Prague since 1959—was invited by New York music historian David Garland to appear on his WNYC radio show Spinning on Air. Deitch played some of the recordings of Converse he had made on a reel-to-reel tape recorder, including her song, "One by One". Two of Garland's listeners, Dan Dzula and David Herman, were inspired to track down any additional recordings of Converse. They found two sources for Converse's music: Deitch's collection in Prague, and a filing cabinet in Ann Arbor containing recordings which Converse had sent to Philip in the late 1950s. In March 2009, How Sad, How Lovely, containing 17 songs by Converse, was released by Lau derette Recordings. That same month, Spinning on Air broadcast an hour-long special about Converse's life and music. Garland also explored the mystery surrounding her disappearance with recordings from Philip Converse and readings of her letters by actress Amber Benson.

In 2015, How Sad, How Lovely was released as an 18 track vinyl recording by Squirrel Thing Recordings, in partnership with the Captured Tracks label. The album has received favorable reviews, including by Los Angeles Times music critic Randall Roberts, who wrote, "Few reissues of the past decade have struck me with more continued, joyous affection as 'How Sad, How Lovely'." The Australian singer-songwriter Robert Forster describes the album as "making a deep and marvelous connection between lyric and song that allows us to enter the world of an extraordinary woman living in mid-twentieth-century New York."

Apart from her 1954 appearance on The Morning Show and a performance of her music in 1961 by folksinger Susan Reed at the Kaufmann Concert Hall in New York, Converse's music was not available to the public until it resurfaced in 2004. Since the 2009 release of her album, however, Converse's life and music have been the subject of news reports around the world. In addition to the mystery surrounding her disappearance, many of these articles focus on the content and style of Converse's music—and the possibility that she may be the earliest performer in the singer-songwriter genre. According to Garland, "Converse wrote and sang back in the 1950s, long before singer-songwriter was a recognized category or style. But everything we value in singer-songwriters today—personal perspective, insight, originality, empathy, intelligence, wry humor—was abundant in her music." Others cite the feminine experience often explored in her lyrics, as well as the themes of sexuality and individualism found in her songs as the reason Converse's music was ahead of its time.

Converse's life and music have served as the inspiration for numerous contemporary artworks, including a play by Howard Fishman, who also produced the album Connie's Piano Songs featuring music written but never recorded by Converse. Other works inspired by Converse include the modern dance piece "Empty Pockets" by John Heginbotham, which was performed at the Miller Theater in 2015; British singer Nat Johnson's "Roving Woman" tribute performances; as well as tribute performances of Converse's music by Jean Rohe and Diane Cluck as part of the Spinning on Air 25th-anniversary special.

In 2017, John Zorn's Tzadik Records released the album Vanity of Vanities: A Tribute to Connie Converse, featuring new recordings of her songs by performers including Mike Patton, Petra Haden, Karen O and Laurie Anderson. "Memories Of Winter", the final track on Canadian singer-songwriter Dana Gavanski's 2020 debut album Yesterday Is Gone, is an homage to Converse. Talking Like Her, a feature documentary first broadcast by SVT in 2021 explored the life, music and disappearance of Converse. Directed by Natacha Giler and Adam Briscoe, the film has been screened at numerous festivals worldwide and has received positive reviews.

Discography

 How Sad, How Lovely (2009; 2015 reissue)
 Connie's Piano Songs (2014) (written by Converse; performed by others)
 Vanity of Vanities: A Tribute to Connie Converse (2017) (written by Converse)
 Sad Lady (2020)

Publications

 Converse, Elizabeth, "A Posteditorial", Journal of Conflict Resolution 16 (1972), 617–619.
 Converse, Elizabeth, "The War of All against All: A review of The Journal of Conflict Resolution, 1957–1968", Journal of Conflict Resolution 12 (1968), 471–532.

See also

 List of people who disappeared

References

External links

1924 births
Missing people
20th-century American singers
Possibly living people
People from Laconia, New Hampshire
Singers from New York City
People from Concord, New Hampshire
Musicians from Ann Arbor, Michigan
American women singer-songwriters
1970s missing person cases
Singer-songwriters from Michigan
20th-century American women singers
Singer-songwriters from New Hampshire
Singer-songwriters from New York (state)